Mendonsa is a surname. Notable people with the surname include:

 Alyssa Mendonsa (born  1990), Indian singer
 Loy Mendonsa, Indian musician
 Warren Mendonsa (born 1979), Indian musician behind Blackstratblues

See also
Mendonça